Gabriel Esteban Caballero Schiker (born 5 February 1971) is a professional football manager and former player. Born in Argentina, he represented the Mexico national team.

Club career
Caballero started playing in his native Argentina's Central Córdoba in 1989, and in 1993 he transferred to Chilean Antofagasta.

In 1995, he arrived in Mexico, and has played for Mexican teams such as Santos Laguna, Pachuca, Atlas and Puebla, winning 6 championships (Santos Laguna, Pachuca), most recently with Pachuca on 27 May 2007. He announced his retirement on 18 November 2009.

International career

Mexico national team
Caballero became a naturalized Mexican on 11 December 2001, and was later recruited to the national team, with whom he had the chance to play in his first World Cup in 2002, held in South Korea and Japan. Caballero appeared in all three of Mexico's first round matches, against Croatia, Ecuador, and Italy.

Managerial career
After his retirement announced his new job as Assistant coach from his last club, on 14 November 2012 he was announced as the new coach of C.F. Pachuca, after the club terminated their previous coach Hugo Sanchez.

Honours

Player
Santos Laguna
Mexican Primera División: Invierno 1996

Pachuca
Mexican Primera División: Invierno 1999, Invierno 2001, Apertura 2003, Clausura 2006, Clausura 2007
CONCACAF Champions' Cup: 2007, 2008
Copa Sudamericana: 2006
North American SuperLiga: 2007

Individual
Primera División Chilena Top Scorer: 1995
Mexican Primera División Top Scorer (Shared): Verano 1997

Manager
Dorados
Ascenso MX: Apertura 2016

Cafetaleros
Ascenso MX: Clausura 2018

References

External links
Interview in Spanish

 
 

1971 births
Living people
Footballers from Santa Fe, Argentina
Argentine emigrants to Mexico
Naturalized citizens of Mexico
Argentine people of German descent
Association football midfielders
Argentine footballers
Mexican footballers
Mexico international footballers
2002 FIFA World Cup players
Central Córdoba de Rosario footballers
C.D. Antofagasta footballers
Santos Laguna footballers
C.F. Pachuca players
Atlas F.C. footballers
Club Puebla players
Liga MX players
Argentine expatriate footballers
Expatriate footballers in Chile
Mexican football managers
C.F. Pachuca managers
Dorados de Sinaloa managers
FC Juárez managers